Oystercatcher Island is an island off the coast of Western Australia. It is part of the Houtman Abrolhos.

References

Islands of the Houtman Abrolhos